Imbi-Camille Tamm (born February 24, 1970), known professionally as Camille Camille is an Estonian violinist.

During 1993-1998 she was the violinist in the band Vennaskond.

In 1999 she represented (with Evelin Samuel) Estonia in Eurovision Song Contest.

References

1970 births
Living people
Estonian violinists
Eurovision Song Contest entrants for Estonia
Eurovision Song Contest entrants of 1999